Éric Lecompte (born April 4, 1975) is a Canadian professional ice hockey left winger.  He was drafted in the first round, 24th overall, by the Chicago Blackhawks in the 1993 NHL Entry Draft.  He never played in the National Hockey League.

Career statistics

External links
 

1975 births
Asiago Hockey 1935 players
Canadian ice hockey left wingers
Chicago Blackhawks draft picks
Cincinnati Mighty Ducks players
EHC Olten players
Fort Wayne Komets players
French Quebecers
HC Lugano players
HC TWK Innsbruck players
Hull Olympiques players
Indianapolis Ice players
Living people
National Hockey League first-round draft picks
Pont Rouge Lois Jeans players
Revier Löwen players
Saint-Jean Lynx players
SC Langenthal players
SCL Tigers players
Sherbrooke Faucons players
Ice hockey people from Montreal
Worcester IceCats players
ZSC Lions players
Canadian expatriate ice hockey players in Austria
Canadian expatriate ice hockey players in Italy
Canadian expatriate ice hockey players in Germany